The city of Bangkok, Thailand was bombed by the Allies on numerous occasions during World War II. It was also the target for the first combat mission by Boeing B-29 Superfortresses in June 1944.

Initial British and American air raids

Allied bombing raids on the Thai capital city of Bangkok began even before Thailand had declared war, since the Empire of Japan was using the country as a staging area for its invasions of both Malaya and Burma, with the reluctant agreement of the Thai government after Japan's successful invasion of the southeast Asian country on 8 December 1941. The first raid came on 7 January 1942, when Royal Air Force (RAF) aircraft flying from Rangoon, attacked military targets in the city. The American Volunteer Group, together with seven No. 113 Squadron RAF and three No. 45 Squadron RAF Bristol Blenheim bombers, were involved in the first raid. No. 113 Squadron's planes were piloted by No. 60 Squadron's air crew. The second night raid was carried out by eight Blenheims on 24–25 January and included No. 60 Squadron RAF aircrew. A final raid was made three days later by four Blenheims. This was the last raid by Blenheims until May or June 1945. The British and American bombings were also aided by the Free Thai Movement, an Allied-aligned, anti-Japanese guerilla movement. Agents of the Free Thai Movement designated targets for Allied planes and locations of Japanese positions and even reported on the weather over the targets.

After Rangoon fell to the Japanese on 7 March, heavy bombers, such as the RAF and American Tenth Air Force Consolidated B-24 Liberators, based in India and China, attacked targets in Thailand. The raids were carried out because Bangkok by then had become a command centre for the Japanese on the Southeast Asian front. RAF and United States Army Air Forces (USAAF,) bombers carried out the raids as part of the Pacific campaigns. The bombers struck installations used by the occupying Japanese military, but the raids were also intended to pressure the government of Thai military strongman Plaek Pibulsongkram to abandon his unpopular alliance with Imperial Japan. The major targets were the newly completed Port of Bangkok and the Thai railway system. Raids by RAF, USAAF, and other Allied air forces continued with growing intensity from India, and after the liberation of Rangoon on 3 May 1945, from Rangoon until the end of the war in August that year. Blenheim bombers and Mustangs operated out of Rangoon against Bangkok in this later phase of the bombing.

First B-29 Superfortress combat mission

In its first combat mission, the American Boeing B-29 Superfortress was used by the XX Bomber Command's 58th Air Division to strike targets in Bangkok, before it was deployed against the Japanese home islands. The decision to use the B-29s to bomb Bangkok dated back to 1943 and was mentioned in a communique between US President Franklin D. Roosevelt and British Prime Minister Winston Churchill in which Roosevelt suggested that they be used to bomb the port and railways.

On 5 June 1944, 98 B-29s led by the 58th's commander, General LaVerne Saunders, flew from airfields in India to attack the Makasan railway yards in Bangkok. A 2,261 mile round trip, the raid was the longest mission to date in the war. Only 77 of the B-29s made it to Bangkok, 21 others having had to turn back because of engine problems. Reaching the Thai capital at about 11:00, the bombers found their targets obscured by bad weather. The B-29s were meant to drop their bombs from between 22,000 and 25,000 feet, but instead released their bombs at between 17,000 and 27,000 feet. Only 18 bombs hit their intended targets. The others destroyed a Japanese military hospital and damaged the Japanese secret police headquarters. On their return to India, 42 of the B-29s had to divert to other airfields because of a lack of fuel. Five of these crashed on landing. Further raids were carried out by the Superfortresses against strategic targets in Bangkok.

Temporary British occupation
At the end of the hostilities, British and Indian military forces arrived in Bangkok to disarm and repatriate the surrendered Japanese. On 9 September 1945, the RAF set up its headquarters under Group Captain Don Finlay of the RAF's 909 Wing at Bangkok's Don Muang airfield. Three RAF squadrons were represented in Siam during the brief occupation: No. 20 Squadron RAF with Spitfire VIII aircraft, No. 211 Squadron RAF with de Havilland Mosquito VI aircraft, and a detachment of No. 685 Squadron RAF with Mosquito photo-reconnaissance aircraft. The airfield was defended by No. 2945 Squadron, RAF Regiment. Almost all the RAF units had left by January 1946.

See also
 Far East Air Force (Royal Air Force)
 Thailand in World War II
 Bombing of South-East Asia (1944–45)

References

External links
 Pattaya Mail: A Slice of Thai History: The Air War Over Thailand, 1941–1945, Part Two, The Allies Attack Thailand, 1942–1945

Internet videos 
 
 

Bangkok
Bangkok
Bangkok
1944 in Thailand
1940s in Bangkok
Military history of Thailand during World War II
Japan–Thailand military relations
Thailand–United Kingdom military relations
Thailand–United States military relations
Bangkok